The Wild One is a wooden roller coaster at Six Flags America in Prince George's County, Maryland. It features a 450° spiral helix and a series of bunny hills that produce a significant amount of air time. The wooden coaster was previously known as Giant Coaster when it was located at Paragon Park in Hull, Massachusetts. It operated there from 1917 to 1984. It is the oldest coaster in any Six Flags park.

History

When the roller coaster first opened in 1917, it was The Giant Coaster at Paragon Park in Nantasket Beach, Massachusetts. The Giant Coaster was a double out-and-back side-friction coaster designed by John A. Miller and built by Herbert Paul Schmeck of the Philadelphia Toboggan Company (PTC). In 1932, after it was partially destroyed by fire, Schmeck redesigned much of the ride using an underfriction track system. In April 1963, another fire destroyed the station, trains, double helix finale and part of the lift hill. The park asked John C. Allen president of PTC to rebuild the coaster as it was, but his estimate proved too high for the traditional park. Instead he left out two bunny hops and the helix finale in order to create an angled approach into the brake run. Although nowhere near as exciting as Miller's finish, Allen gave the park an affordable alternative to tearing down the coaster. 

On July 19, 1963, Forest Park Highlands in St. Louis suffered from a massive fire, but its roller coaster, Comet, remained standing. When Comet was torn down in 1968, Paragon Park bought its trains as opposed to buying more expensive ones from PTC. The trains continued to have the name "Comet" labeled on the front car during the remaining years of Giant Coaster's operation.

Sale and move
The Giant Coaster closed with Paragon Park in 1984 and was sold to Wild World (now Six Flags America), which acquired the ride in a last minute bid at auction. Charlie Dinn of the Dinn Corporation was contracted to relocate the ride and supervised the reconstruction. Curtis D. Summers reworked sections of the layout, and restored the helix finale that had been lost in the 1963 fire. The ride opened in 1986 as The Wild One and although popular with riders was considered to be fairly intense. The financially plagued park owners had difficulties maintaining the coaster, and it quickly developed a reputation for being rough. Several rides, including the coaster, did not open for the 1991 season.

Current design
In the winter of 1991/1992 the park was sold to Tierco Group, Inc. Tierco hired John F. Pierce Associates to refurbish the coaster. The first and second drops were dramatically reprofiled, and the rest of the ride was fine-tuned with portions retracked. In subsequent years the ride has been retracked multiple times with much of the recent work completed by Martin & Vleminckx. American Coaster Enthusiasts awarded The Wild One the organization's Coaster Landmark award on June 18, 2018.

Records

References

External links
 Wild One at Six Flags America

Hull, Massachusetts
Roller coasters introduced in 1917
Roller coasters operated by Six Flags
Six Flags America
Former roller coasters in Massachusetts
Roller coasters in Maryland